Cahiers de Linguistique Asie Orientale is a peer-reviewed academic journal of East Asian linguistics that was established in 1978 and is published by Brill. The articles published before 2007 are in free access on the Persée website.

It publishes articles in English, French and Mandarin Chinese, and covers a wide range of topics including Generative syntax, Linguistic typology, Phonetics, Phonology and Historical linguistics on all languages of the Sino-Tibetan, Austro-Asiatic, Austronesian, Hmong-Mien, Kra-Dai, Tungusic, Mongolic and Turkic families, as well as on Japanese, Korean and Ainu.

It is indexed in Scopus.

External links 
 Back issues (volumes 1–42, to 2012) on Persée
 Cahiers de Linguistique Asie Orientale at Brill Online

Linguistics journals
Brill Publishers academic journals
Publications established in 1978
English-language journals
French-language journals
Chinese-language journals
Biannual journals